Norwegian Institute of Local History is a division of the National Library of Norway. It was established in 1955 as an independent institute under the Norwegian Ministry of Culture and Church Affairs and became part of the National Library in 2017. 

Its purpose is to “promote local and regional historical activity in Norway” both by carrying out its own research and by supporting independent researchers. It also runs the websites lokalhistorie.no, lokalhistoriewiki.no and historieblogg.no. Its current director is Dag Hundstad.

External links 

 lokalhistorie.no 
 lokalhistoriewiki.no 
 historieblogg.no

References

Government agencies of Norway
Historiography of Norway
Research institutes in Norway
History institutes
Education in Oslo
Organisations based in Oslo
Government agencies established in 1955
Local history
History organisations based in Norway
1955 establishments in Norway